Scipione Tecchi J.C.D. S.T.D. (27 June 1854 – 7 February 1915) was a Cardinal of the Roman Catholic Church who served as Prefect of the Congregation of Rites.

Early life and priesthood
Tecchi was born in Rome, Italy. He was educated at the Pontifical Roman Seminary where he was awarded doctorates in theology and canon law.

He was ordained on 23 December 1876 in Rome. After his ordination, he did pastoral work in the diocese of Rome from 1877 until 1908. He also worked as a scriptor of the Apostolic Penitentiary. He was created Privy chamberlain supernumerary on 22 December 1893. He was also beneficiary coadjutor of the chapter of the patriarchal Vatican basilica in 1899 as well as being canon of the patriarchal Lateran basilica. He was raised to the rank of Domestic Prelate on 6 May 1901 and finally Protonotary apostolicon 27 September of that year.

Cardinalate
He was made a cardinal by Pope Pius X Cardinal-Deacon of Santa Maria in Domnica in the consistory of 25 May 1914, in which the future Pope Benedict XV was also made a cardinal. Tecchi participated in the conclave of 1914 that elected Benedict XV. He was appointed as Prefect of the Congregation of Rites on 8 November 1914, holding the post until his death in early 1915. He was buried at the Campo Verano cemetery.

References

1854 births
1915 deaths
20th-century Italian cardinals
Members of the Sacred Congregation for Rites
Pontifical Roman Seminary alumni
Cardinals created by Pope Pius X